Ben Ransom (born 16 February 1992 in Bexley, Kent) is an ex-rugby union player who last played for London Irish in the Greene King IPA Championship. He played at Fullback and has represented England at U16, U18 and U20 level. He was educated at Tonbridge School in Kent. He previously attended St Michael’s School, Otford and appeared for Old Elthamians, having first played the game at school and club when seven.

The 2010-11 Aviva Premiership was the season Ransom made his debut for Saracens against the Northampton Saints and he was named man of the match. Overall in the season he made 4 appearances and scored 1 try. Having turned down an offer from the University of Bristol when signing for Sarries, he undertook a degree in economics at Hertfordshire University alongside playing rugby. In the six seasons he spent with Saracens, he made 44 appearances, along with 21 appearances on loan to Bedford Blues and helped the club win the Premiership title three times as well as the European Rugby Champions Cup.

On 22 July it was announced that Ransom had joined newly relegated London Irish ahead of the 2016-17 season and his spell started well as they gained their first Championship title and promotion back to the Premiership, with Ransom featuring in the majority of their 19 wins. The clinical winger notched up nine tries during that season, including a contender for Try of the Season in the annual Saint Patrick's Party against Cornish Pirates, a match that also had the Championship season's highest attendance of 11,671. The following season, Ransom fell behind in the pecking order and first-team appearances were limited to the European Challenge Cup. In October 2017, he scored in an emphatic 7-44 win against Challenge Cup holders Stade Français at the Stade Jean-Bouin. In the final Premiership Rugby A League fixture of the season, Ransom scored as Irish recorded a 33-19 victory against Bristol Bears. Irish were relegated and Ransom decided to leave the club a year before his contract expired in order to pursue his other ambitions.

In 2018, after spells at both Saracens and London Irish, the 26-year-old Ransom began studying for a master's degree in Business administration at the University of Oxford and preparing to move into investment banking – although not before one last bout – taking full advantage, Oxford wasted no time before he was seconded to help beat Cambridge in The Varsity Match, for which he was only too happy to oblige, and unsurprisingly, with his pedigree, Oxford won 38-16 and Ransom was named man of the match.

References

External links 
 England Under 20s Profile
 London Irish: REACTION: Ben Ransom & George Robson - 19 September 2016 - Ben Ransom and George Robson analyse Saturday's 30-23 win at Bedford Blues.

1992 births
Living people
People from Bexley
People educated at St Michael's Preparatory School, Otford
People educated at Tonbridge School
English rugby union players
London Irish players
Saracens F.C. players
Bedford Blues players
Oxford University RFC players
Rugby union players from Kent
Rugby union fullbacks